Wizard's Tower Press is an independent small press, specializing in the publication of new and minority authors and the republication of out of print works of science fiction and fantasy fiction with the aim of improving access for writers to the e-book market.  It was founded in 2010 by Cheryl Morgan. The press produces the literary review magazine Salon Futura.

The company has published work by Joanne Hall, Roz Clarke, Colin Harvey, Ben Jeapes, Andy Bigwood, Juliet E. McKenna and Lyda Morehouse

References

British speculative fiction publishers
Publishing companies established in 2010
Science fiction publishers
Small press publishing companies
Science fiction magazines published in the United Kingdom
2010 establishments in the United Kingdom